Kenneth Ralston (born 1954) is an American visual effects artist, currently the Visual Effect Supervisor and Creative Head at Sony Pictures Imageworks. Ralston began his career at the commercial animation and visual effects company, Cascade Pictures in Hollywood, where he worked on over 150 advertising campaigns in the early 1970s. In 1976, he was hired at Industrial Light & Magic by Dennis Muren to help George Lucas create the effects for Star Wars. He remained at ILM for 20 years before joining Sony Pictures Imageworks as president. Ralston is best known for his work in the films of Robert Zemeckis.

Ralston has won five Academy Award for Best Visual Effects, including a Special Achievement Oscar for the visual effects in Return of the Jedi (1983), and regular awards for his work on Cocoon (1985), Who Framed Roger Rabbit (1988), Death Becomes Her (1992) and Forrest Gump (1994). He was nominated three more times for Dragonslayer (1981), Back to the Future Part II (1989) and Alice in Wonderland (2010).

Ken has contributed to several DVD commentaries:

King Kong (1933) - with visual effects creator Ray Harryhausen
Mighty Joe Young (1949) - with visual effects creator Ray Harryhausen and actress Terry Moore
Who Framed Roger Rabbit (1988) - with director Robert Zemeckis, producer Frank Marshall, associate producer Steve Starkey, screenwriters Jeffrey Price and Peter S. Seaman
Contact (1997) - with visual effects supervisor Stephen Rosenbaum
Cast Away (2000) - with cinematographer Don Burgess, visual effects supervisor Carey Villegas, sound designer Randy Thom

Filmography
 Star Wars (1977) (assistant cameraman: miniature and optical effects unit)
 The Empire Strikes Back (1980) (effects cameraman: miniature and optical effects unit)
 Dragonslayer (1981) (dragon supervisor: ILM)
 Star Trek II: The Wrath of Khan (1982) (special visual effects supervisor: ILM)
 Return of the Jedi (1983) (visual effects)
 Star Trek III: The Search for Spock (1984) (visual effects supervisor)
 Cocoon (1985) (visual effects supervisor)
 Back to the Future (1985) (visual effects supervisor: Bafta)
 Star Trek IV: The Voyage Home (1986) (effects supervisor)
 The Golden Child (1986) (visual effects supervisor)
 Who Framed Roger Rabbit (1988) (visual effects supervisor)
 Back to the Future Part II (1989) (visual effects supervisor)
 Dreams (1990) (visual effects supervisor)
 Back to the Future Part III (1990) (visual effects supervisor)
 The Rocketeer (1991) (visual effects supervisor, second unit director)
 Death Becomes Her (1992) (visual effects supervisor, second unit director)
 Forrest Gump (1994) (visual effects supervisor)
 The Mask (1994) (visual effects consultant)
 The American President (1995) (visual effects supervisor)
 Jumanji (1995) (visual effects supervisor)
 Phenomenon (1996) (visual effects supervisor: SPI)
 Michael (1996) (visual effects supervisor: SPI)
 Contact (1997) (visual effects supervisor)
 Patch Adams (1998) (visual effects guru)
 Cast Away (2000) (visual effects supervisor)
 America's Sweethearts (2001) (visual effects consultant)
 Men in Black II (2002) (visual effects supervisor: SPI)
 The Forgotten (2004) (visual effects consultant)
 The Polar Express (2004) (visual effects supervisor)
 Beowulf (2007) (visual effects design consultant, special effects)
 Alice in Wonderland (2010) (senior visual effects supervisor)
 Men in Black 3 (2012) (visual effects supervisor)
 Alice Through the Looking Glass (2016) (visual effects supervisor)

References

External links
 

1954 births
Living people
Special effects people
Visual effects supervisors
Best Visual Effects Academy Award winners
Best Visual Effects BAFTA Award winners
Special Achievement Academy Award winners
Stop motion animators
Industrial Light & Magic people